For the Term of His Natural Life is a story and 1874 novel by Marcus Clarke.

For the Term of His Natural Life may also refer to:

For the Term of His Natural Life (1908 film)
For the Term of His Natural Life (1927 film)
For the Term of His Natural Life (miniseries)

See also
Life imprisonment